Back to the Woods may refer to:
 Back to the Woods (1918 Goldwyn film), a comedy film starring Mabel Normand
 Back to the Woods (1919 film), a comedy short starring Harold Lloyd
 Back to the Woods (1937 film), a Three Stooges short
 "Back to the Woods" (Family Guy), an episode of Family Guy
 Back to the Woods (album), by Angel Haze